National Historic Ships UK  is a government-funded independent organisation that advises UK governments and others on matters relating to historic ships. It is sponsored by the Headley Trust, the National Lottery Heritage Fund and the Department for Digital, Culture, Media and Sport.

Background

National Historic Ships UK is the successor of the Advisory Committee on National Historic Ships, which was established in 2006 as non-departmental public body reporting to the Department for Culture, Media and Sport with a specific remit to advise the Secretary of State and other public bodies on ship preservation and funding priorities.

The Advisory Committee on National Historic Ships, in turn, was the successor to the National Historic Ships Committee, which emerged from a seminar held in 1991 to discuss the problems facing the preservation of historic ships and vessels in the UK and the evident neglect of this important part of British heritage. Strong support was expressed for the creation of a co-ordinating body that could provide an overview of all aspects of historic ship preservation and the Committee was formally launched on 15 July 1992 by Lord Lewin, then Chairman of Trustees of the National Maritime Museum.

National Historic Ships UK carries a wider remit than its predecessor body, looking not only at the immediate issues concerning historic vessels in the UK, but also addressing questions relating to the support infrastructure for historic ships, their potential for contributing in the wider economic, social and community context, and by maintaining a watch list of vessels abroad with potential UK significance. As well as providing formal advice to funding bodies, it also gives direct assistance to vessel owners, for example through its small grants scheme and its directory of relevant skills and services.

The National Register of Historic Vessels and National Archive of Historic Vessels
The National Register of Historic Vessels (NRHV) is a database that lists vessels that are:
At least 50 years old 
Demonstrably and significantly associated with the UK 
Based in UK waters 
More than 33 ft (10.07 metres) in length overall (length OA) measured between the forward and aft extremities of the hull overall excluding any spars or projections. 
Substantially intact

Inclusion on the Register is with the owner's consent. The records include details of designer, builder, dimensions, construction, propulsion, service history and current location, as well as images of many of the vessels.

The National Register of Historic Vessels contains a sub-group of some 200 vessels that comprise The National Historic Fleet. These vessels are distinguished by: 
Being of pre-eminent national or regional significance
Spanning the spectrum of UK maritime history
Illustrating changes in construction and technology 
Meriting a higher priority for long term preservation

The National Historic Fleet may also include vessels from the National Small Ships Register that are a minimum of 50 years and fit the above criteria.

The National Archive of Historic Vessels includes details of vessels no longer on the NRHV because they have been scrapped, lost, or moved abroad. It also includes vessels that do not meet all the criteria for inclusion on the NRHV but are nevertheless of historic interest.

There are currently over 1,000 vessels on the National Register of Historic Vessels and over 400 vessels on the National Archive of Historic Vessels. 
The registers provide an authoritative assessment of the significance of historic vessels. The database can also be used to identify and prioritise vessels that should be preserved, provide guidance to decision-makers on the allocation of funding, and give an early warning of ships 'at risk'. The database can also be a useful research tool, although confidential information about ownership etc. is always kept secure.

Over 57% of historic vessels recorded on the National Register of Historic Vessels are either privately owned or commercially operated. Museums and charitable trusts account for 14% of the total.

Fully searchable versions of the databases (excluding ownership information) are available on National Historic Ships' website.

See also
Barcelona Charter
List of museum ships
National Historic Fleet

References

External links
 National Historic Ships website

 
History organisations based in London
Heritage organisations in the United Kingdom
Maritime history of the United Kingdom
Conservation in the United Kingdom
2006 establishments in the United Kingdom
Organizations established in 2006